Frederick Randolph Brooks (born January 30, 1950) is an American television and film actor known for his role as L.A.P.D. Detective Holdaway in the 1992 hit cult film Reservoir Dogs. Brooks also starred in the 1988 hit drama film Colors.

Brooks is also well known in the soap opera community; he starred on Generations in 1990 as Eric Royal, on The Young and the Restless as Nathan Hastings from 1992–95, on Another World as Marshall Lincoln Kramer from 1994–95, and on All My Children as Hayes Grady in 1996.

He has starred in a couple of short-lived television series, including Brothers and Sisters in 1979, The Renegades in 1983, and Emerald Point N.A.S. in 1983.

Brooks has made many guest appearances on many television shows, including One Day at a Time, The Fall Guy, In the Heat of the Night, The White Shadow, Hill Street Blues, Hunter, 21 Jump Street, Murder, She Wrote, Family Law, and Judging Amy.  He had a recurring role as White House reporter Arthur Leeds on The West Wing.

He was previously married to Karyn Parsons.

Filmography 
Halls of Anger (1970) - Sabin
The Monkey Hustle (1976) - Win
Underground Aces (1981) - Ollie
Senior Trip (1981, TV Movie) - David
8 Million Ways to Die (1986) - Chance
Assassination (1987) - Tyler Loudermilk
Colors (1988) - Ron Delaney
Black Snow (1990) - The Afrikan
Daughter of the Streets (1990, TV Movie) - Byron
Defenseless (1991) - Monroe
Reservoir Dogs (1992) - Detective Holdaway
Miracle in the Woods (1997, TV Movie) - Henry Cooper Sr.
Rocket's Red Glare (2000, TV Movie) - Owen
Redemption (2002) - Phillips
Don't Touch if You Ain't Prayed (2005) - Jordan Bryant
VooDoo Curse: The Giddeh (2006) - Professor Harris
Sorority Sister Slaughter (2007) - Billy Bart

References

External links 

Male actors from New York City
American male film actors
American male soap opera actors
Living people
1950 births
African-American male actors
American male television actors
21st-century African-American people
20th-century African-American people